Lawa Tehsil (تحصیل لاوا), is a tehsil of Talagang District in the Punjab province of Pakistan. It is located with an altitude of 508 metres (1669 feet) and lies adjacent to Mianwali District. Lawa is pre-dominantly inhabited by the Awan tribe. It has boundaries with Mardwal via Goohal on one side while through Darbata is links with Kalabagh. Neighbour is Danda Shah Bilawal & Wadi Soon Sakesar.

Education
Lawa has Notable Islamic & Asri Educational Institutions

Islamic Madaris

 Jamaya Shaeed Masjid
 Jamaya  Khatme Nabuwat
 Jamaya Anwar ul Quran

Government Institutes

 Government Higher Secondary School For Boys No 1 & 2
 Government Higher Secondary School for Girls No 1 & 2
 Government Degree College for Women

Private Schools

 Zaib Public School Lawa (Boys & Girls)
 Zest Public School
 Masabeeh Public School
 Mumadan Public School
 Holy Public School
 THE Educator System Lawa
 AlRasheed Islamic Education System Lawa(AIES)

Climate 
Lawa is 417m above sea level. In Lāwa, the climate is warm and temperate. In winter, there is much less rainfall in Lāwa than in summer. According humid subtropical climate (Köppen Cwa).The average temperature in Lāwa is 22.6 °C | 72.7 °F. The rainfall here is around 887 mm | 34.9 inch per year.
The driest month is November. There is 19 mm | 0.7 inch of precipitation in November. With an average of 193 mm | 7.6 inch, the most precipitation falls in July.

With an average of 32.2 °C | 90.0 °F, June is the warmest month. January has the lowest average temperature of the year. It is 11.4 °C | 52.5 °F

Events

Jashn-e- Nezabazi

Jashn-e- Nezabazi Lawa is an annual event held in March on Danda Lawa road. Teams come from all over Punjab. 200 horses and riders participated. Malik Ameer Mohammed khan nawab of Lawa was a famous player of nezabazi back in 50s n 60s.

Winners

 Single section. Winner Allamdar Hasnainia Club of Pakistan
 4 section. Winner Malik Uddra Club of Pakistan
 8 section. Winner Rokhari Club of Pakistan

References 

Tehsils of Punjab, Pakistan
Talagang District